The University of North Texas College of Business is a constituent college of the University of North Texas in Denton.  It is organized in five academic departments — (i) Accounting, (ii) Finance, Insurance, Real Estate & Law (FIREL), (iii) Information Technology & Decision Sciences, (iv) Management, and (v) Marketing & Logistics. The College also has six interdisciplinary centers — (a) the Center for NAFTA Studies, (b) the Information Systems Research Center, (c) the Institute of Petroleum Accounting, (d) the Murphy Center for Entrepreneurship (e) the Professional Leadership Program, and (f) the Center for Logistics Education & Research.  The College awards Bachelors, Masters, and Doctor of Philosophy degrees.

Research centers & professional institute 
The college is host to three research centers, one applied academics center, and one institute:
 Center for Decision and Information Technologies is a partnership among UNT, industry, and other universities that focus on information technology management, education, and research
 Institute of Petroleum Accounting, founded  years ago
 Murphy Center for Entrepreneurship, in its  year
 Center for Logistics Education and Research partners with industry to innovate and structure advanced logistics and supply chains in Texas and around the globe
 Professional Development Institute is an educational enterprise founded  years ago within the College of Business and, in December 1982, restructured as a non-profit, tax exempt Texas corporation.  A component of its mission is to provide continuing education required for professional certifications such as the CPA.  PDI draws upon scholars and adjunct industry practitioners to provide training in subjects that include petroleum accounting, professional accounting, insurance, information systems, finance, and management.  As an example of PDI's reach in the past, in 1983, it sponsored 436 programs in 93 cities in 31 states and six countries.  PDI was the impetus for erecting a Sheraton hotel and conference center in 1985 through a lease on the site of the university's golf course clubhouse.  The university took over the lease from Radisson and demolished the structure in 2009 to make way for a new, larger conference center.  As of 2010, CPE courses — which historically have accounted for much of PDI's enrollment — have been offered online.

Graduate school 

North Texas offers 12 MBA, 7 Master of Science, and 3 joint MBA/MS programs.

History 
The college was founded in 1946 as the School of Business Administration.  O. J. Curry served as dean from its inception to 1969. The name change, from School of Business Administration to College of Business Administration was approved by the Texas Higher Education Coordinating Board October 1971.

Deans

National and international recognition 
 Logistics & Supply Chain Management
 In 2011, Gartner Research ranked the college's logistics program among the top 23 in North America
 In 2012, International Journal of Physical Distribution & Logistics Management ranked the logistics program top 5 in the world for research productivity
 Transportation Journal ranked the logistics program 22nd globally in terms of research productivity

 Accounting Tax
 BYU Accounting Research Rankings, for papers published in tax by PhD candidates:

 Online graduate business programs
 U.S. News & World Report ranked the North Texas 15th, nationally, in its publication of "Best Online MBA Programs."

Accreditation 
The College of Business is accredited in business and accounting by the Association to Advance Collegiate Schools of Business.  In 1961, its undergraduate business program received AACSB accreditation.  In the spring of 1964, the Master of Business program received AACSB accreditation.  At that time, about seventy-five MBA programs in the country and one other in the state — The University of Texas at Austin — was accredited by the AACSB.

Also at that time (1964), the College of Business was second in the state and the southwest, next to the University of Texas at Austin, and 11th in the nation, with the University of Southern California, in number of bachelor's degrees conferred.

The College of Business began its first PhD program  years ago — in the fall of 1965.

References
 Inline citations

 Primary sources

External links
 

Colleges and departments
Business schools in Texas
Educational institutions established in 1946
1946 establishments in Texas